The 1933 Home Nations Championship was the twenty-ninth series of the rugby union Home Nations Championship. Including the previous incarnations as the Five Nations, and prior to that, the Home Nations, this was the forty-sixth series of the northern hemisphere rugby union championship. Six matches were played between 21 January and 1 April. It was contested by England, Ireland, Scotland and Wales.

Table

Results

England: Brown (Bristol), Booth (Headingley), Burland (Bristol), Gerrard (Bath), Aarvold (Blackheath) (capt.), Elliot (US Portsmouth), Key (Old Cranleighans), Longland (Northampton), Gregory (Bristol), Evans (US Portsmouth), Webb (Devonport Services), Roncoroni (Richmond), Bolton (Wakefield), Vaughan-Jones (US Portsmouth), Black (Blackheath)

Wales: Jenkins (Bridgend), Boon (Cardiff), Davey (Swansea), Wooller (Rydal School), AH Jones (Cardiff), Bowcott (London Welsh), Turnbull (Cardiff), Jones (Llanelli), Evans (Llanelli), Skym (Llanelli RFC), Bark-Jones (Cambridge Univ.), Thomas (Swansea), Arthur (Neath), Isaacs (Cardiff), Thomas (Swansea) (capt.)

Wales: Bayliss (Pontypool), Hickman (Neath), Davey (Swansea), Wooller (Rydal School), AH Jones (Cardiff), Morris (Swansea), Evans (Swansea), Jones (Llanelli), Evans (Llanelli), Skym (Llanelli RFC), Bark-Jones (Cambridge Univ.), Thomas (Swansea), Arthur (Neath), Isaacs (Cardiff), Thomas (Swansea) (capt.)

Scotland: Brown (Cambridge Univ.), Smith (London Scottish) (capt.), Lorraine (Oxford Univ.), Lind (Dunfermline), Fyfe (Cambridge Univ.), Jackson (Oxford Univ.), Logan (Edinburgh Wanderers), Waters (Selkirk), Ritchie (Watsonians), Thom (Watsonians), Beattie (Hawick, Stewart (Stewart's FP), Welsh (Hawick), Henderson (Edinburgh Acads), Rowand (Glasgow HSFP) 

Ireland: Pratt (Dublin Univ.), Lightfoot (Landsdowne), Crowe (Landsdowne), Barnes (Dublin Univ.), Waide (NIFC), Davy (Landsdowne), Murray (Wanderers), Dunne (Landsdowne), Pike (Landsdowne), O'Neill (UC Cork), Russell (UC Cork), Siggins (Belfast Collegians), Charles Beamish (NIFC), George Beamish (Leicester) (capt.), Ross (Queen's U. Belfast)

Wales: Jenkins (Bridgend), Williams (Cardiff), G Jones (Cardiff), Wooller (Colwyn Bay), Boon (Cardiff), Bowcott (London Welsh), Turnbull (Cardiff), Jones (Llanelli), Bowdler (Cross Keys), Skym (Llanelli RFC), Barrell (Cardiff), Billy Moore (Bridgend), Rees (Cardiff), Lemon (Neath), Thomas (Swansea) (capt.)

External links

1933
Home Nations
Home Nations
Home Nations
Home Nations
Home Nations
Home Nations Championship
Home Nations Championship
Home Nations Championship
Home Nations Championship